PC Gerald Michael "Ged" Walker (15 January 1960 – 9 January 2003) was an English police dog handler with Nottinghamshire Police who was killed in the line of duty in Bulwell, Nottingham, in 2003.

On 7 January 2003, PC Walker was dragged 100 yards (roughly 90 m) and fatally injured by a stolen taxi as he reached into the vehicle in an attempt to remove the keys from the ignition. He died in hospital two days later from serious head injuries. He was survived by his widow and two children.

In December 2003, 26-year-old drug addict David Parfitt was convicted of Walker's manslaughter and sentenced to 13 years in prison. He had been on licence at the time of the incident for a previous robbery offence.

In September 2005, a memorial stone for PC Walker was unveiled at the junction of St. Albans Road and Cantrell Road in Bulwell, close to the location of the fatal incident. Present at the unveiling were Michael Winner, the founder and chairman of the Police Memorial Trust, Walker's widow, and the chief constable of Nottinghamshire Police.

A dog show has been held annually in Long Eaton in memory of Walker since his death in 2003. The police station in Bulwell where he was stationed has been named the Ged Walker Building.

See also
List of British police officers killed in the line of duty

References

External links
BBC News article on memorial
Memorial vandalised and reward offered to catch vandals
Funeral of PC Ged Walker

1960 births
2000s in Nottingham
2003 deaths
2003 crimes in the United Kingdom
2003 in England
British manslaughter victims
British police officers killed in the line of duty
Crime in Nottinghamshire
Date of birth missing
Deaths by person in England
History of Nottingham